Sandis Tsaka is a Papua New Guinean rugby league administrator. He is the Chairman of the Asia-Pacific Rugby League Confederation and also the chairman of Papua New Guinea Rugby Football League.

References

Living people
Year of birth missing (living people)
Place of birth missing (living people)
Papua New Guinean rugby league administrators
Papua New Guinean sportsmen